The following is a list of episodes from the American animated satirical television series Our Cartoon President.

Series overview

Episodes

Season 1 (2018)

Special (2018)

Season 2 (2019)

Season 3 (2020)
Note: Due to the COVID-19 pandemic effect, all Season 3 episodes from August 2020 to November 2020 were animated remotely.

Notes

References

Our Cartoon President
Our Cartoon President